The Palo Alto International Film Festival (abbreviated as PAIFF) was a four-day festival that ran at the end of September. The Festival celebrated the innovation in cinema. PAIFF's speakers series, Palo Alto Talks, hosted conversations between industry leaders in film and technology.

Opening Night Films 

The 2012 festival opened with the film Looper directed by Rian Johnson.

The 2011 festival opened with the film Life in a Day directed by Kevin Macdonald.

Tech Doc Competition 

The 2012 Tech Doc Competition

References

External links 
 "Official Website"
 "Variety"

September events
Tourist attractions in Santa Clara County, California
Palo Alto, California
Film festivals in the San Francisco Bay Area